The Chemnitz Zoo is a zoo in the city Chemnitz in  Sachsen, Germany.

During the first decenniums most species reflected the nature of the Soviet Union, and later the zoo reconcepted into breeding of endangered species. In 2014 The Zoo had 178.233 visitors. In 2004, a lion wounded a female zookeeper, and in 2006 another female zookeeper was killed by a leopard. After the female Amur tiger Taiga died in the fall of 2016, the male Jantar lived alone in the tiger enclosure. In December 2017, a second Amur tiger, Wolodja from the Nuremberg Zoo, moved into the facility again. However, the already 19-year-old Jantar was euthanized just a few weeks later.

Literature 
 Anja Dube et al.: 50 Jahre Tierpark Chemnitz. Kommunikation & Design Verlag, Lugau 2014, .

See also 
 List of zoos in Germany
 Elephant Database:Elephants at zoo locations in Germany

References

External links

 
 Chemnitz Zoo at Zoo-Infos.de (in English)

Zoos in Germany
Zoos established in 1964
Zoological Garden
Zoological Garden